Sergio Fabián González (born 5 April 1995) is an Argentine professional footballer who plays as a forward for Guillermo Brown.

Career
González began in Villa Mitre's youth, before joining Lanús in January 2013. He was promoted into Lanús' first-team for the 2015 Argentine Primera División, he made thirty-three appearances and scored six goals in his first season; making his debut against Belgrano on 23 February, scoring his first goal versus Atlético de Rafaela on 11 July. He made one further appearance in the following season of 2016, prior to leaving Lanús on loan in October 2016 to join fellow Primera División team Defensa y Justicia. He made three appearances for Defensa y Justicia before returning to his parent club on 30 June 2017.

Ahead of 2017–18, González joined Primera B Nacional's San Martín on loan. He scored his first goal for San Martín on 28 October against Deportivo Morón. In July 2018, González was signed on loan by Cypriot side Alki Oroklini. However, he returned to his homeland soon after. Guillermo Brown became his fifth career club, his fourth on loan, in January 2019.

Career statistics
.

Honours
Lanús
Argentine Primera División: 2016

References

External links

1995 births
Living people
People from Río Negro Province
Argentine footballers
Association football forwards
Argentine expatriate footballers
Argentine Primera División players
Primera Nacional players
Villa Mitre footballers
Club Atlético Lanús footballers
Defensa y Justicia footballers
San Martín de Tucumán footballers
Alki Oroklini players
Guillermo Brown footballers
Independiente Rivadavia footballers
Niki Volos F.C. players
Expatriate footballers in Cyprus
Expatriate footballers in Greece
Argentine expatriate sportspeople in Cyprus
Argentine expatriate sportspeople in Greece